Alexander John Ligertwood (Lĭ-jərt-wood)  (born 18 December 1946) is a Scottish singer, guitarist and drummer.

Early life, family and education

Ligertwood was born in Glasgow, Scotland.

Career
He is best known as the lead vocalist of Santana, with five different stints from 1979 to 1994, which included the US Festival in 1982. He is credited on songs by Santana such as "All I Ever Wanted", "You Know That I Love You", "Winning" and "Hold On". He also performed with the Senate, the Jeff Beck Group  and Brian Auger's Oblivion Express. He  appeared with Go Ahead side project started by members of Grateful Dead, John Cipollina and friends, the Average White Band and David Sancious.

Ligertwood sang lead vocals on the song "Crank It Up" by the Dregs, (previously known as Dixie Dregs), from the album Industry Standard (1982), as well as contributing the lead vocal on the song "Double Bad" from Jeff Lorber's album In the Heat of the Night (1984).

In 1972, he was a member of the ephemerous Troc band with drummer André Ceccarelli, bassist Jannick Top, pianist Henri Giordano and guitarist Jacky Giraudo. 

From 1986 to 1988, Ligertwood was a member of Go Ahead with Bill Kreutzmann and Brent Mydland.

During 2000, he toured with World Classic Rockers. He sang on a cover of the Scorpions song "Is There Anybody There", which appears on drummer Herman Rarebell's solo album Acoustic Fever (2013). In 2014, Ligertwood's vocals were featured on tracks by El Chicano. In the same year, he toured in Japan and Europe with Brian Auger and the Oblivion Express.

In 2014, Ligertwood was invited by producer Gerry Gallagher to record with Latin rock band El Chicano, as well as Alphonse Mouzon, David Paich, Brian Auger, Ray Parker Jr., Lenny Castro, Siedah Garrett, Walfredo Reyes Jr., Vikki Carr, Pete Escovedo, Peter Michael Escovedo, Jessy J, Marcos J. Reyes, Salvador Santana and Spencer Davis. His vocals are featured on the songs "Make Love", "The Viper" and "Outbound" from a Gallagher studio collaboration.

Ligertwood has also performed with the Magic of Santana, a German tribute  band whose guests have included other former Santana members.

References

External links

1946 births
Living people
Musicians from Glasgow
Scottish rock singers
20th-century Scottish male singers
Scottish rock guitarists
Scottish drummers
Santana (band) members
Average White Band members
Go Ahead (band) members
The Jeff Beck Group members
People from Chipping Barnet
World Classic Rockers members